
The following lists events that happened during 1837 in South Africa.

Events
 Voortrekker Louis Trichardt arrives in Lourenço Marques, Mozambique
 Separate administrative districts are granted to Port Elizabeth, Cradock and Colesberg
 17 January Voortrekkers under Andries Potgieter, Piet Uys and Gerrit Maritz, helped by Rolong and Griqua tribes, defeat Ndebele at Mosega
 2 February - Voortrekker leader Piet Retief publishes his Manifesto which sets out the reasons the Voortrekkers are leaving the Cape Colony
 28 March - Piet Retief and his followers leave the Cape Colony
 23 April - Piet Retief orders Erasmus Smit to be ordained as a minister of the Voortrekkers, but meets with opposition because they consider him as being too old and sickly at 59
 October - The voortrekkers under the leadership of Piet Retief arrived in Natal over the Drakensberg mountains after trekking overland from the Cape Colony during the Great Trek.

References
See Years in South Africa for list of References

 
South Africa
Years in South Africa